Albatàrrec is a municipality in the comarca of the Segrià in Catalonia.

Demography

References

External links 
Official website
 Government data pages 

Municipalities in Segrià
Populated places in Segrià